Arakaka is a community in the Barima-Waini region of Guyana, standing on the Barima River and 12 miles southerly of Port Kaituma, at an altitude of 63 metres (209 feet).

It is the centre of the gold-bearing district, featuring lateritic-saprolitic deposits. Gold mining in the area has attracted international mining companies, such as Alicanto Minerals Ltd (Australia) and Barrick Gold Corporation (Canada).

The population of Arakaka varies according to the amount of mineral extraction in the region.  Launches formerly ascended the river regularly to Arakaka, where a mining warden was stationed. Arakaka has a police outpost.

Matthews Ridge is a nearby settlement also in the Matarkai sub-region.

Demographics 
According to the 2002 population census, it had 276 inhabitants. This number varies according to the mineral extraction activity in the region.

References

Populated places in Barima-Waini